Korea Republic women's national under-20 football team represents Republic of Korea in international youth football competitions.

Team image

Nicknames
The South Korea women's national under-20 football team has been known or nicknamed as the "Taegeuk Nangja (Taegeuk Ladies)".

Results and fixtures

 Legend

2022

Coaching staff

Current coaching staff

Players

Current squad
The following 21 players represented South Korea on the 2022 FIFA U-20 Women's World Cup, held in Costa Rica in August 2022.

(Players are listed within position group by order of seniority, kit number, caps, goals, and then alphabetically)

Competitive record

FIFA U-20 Women's World Cup

AFC U-20 Women's Asian Cup

*Draws include knockout matches decided on penalty kicks.

See also
Sport in South Korea
Football in South Korea
Women's football in South Korea
South Korea women's national football team
South Korea women's national under-17 football team
South Korea women's national futsal team
South Korea men's national football team

References

External links
 South Korea women's national under-20 football team – official website at kfa.or.kr
 KWFL official website
 FIFA U-20 Women's World Cup Korea Republic team page

 
Youth football in South Korea
Asian women's national under-20 association football teams
Football